The 1994 Orlando Predators season was the fourth season for the Orlando Predators. They finished the 1994 season 11–1 and lost in ArenaBowl VIII to the Arizona Rattlers.

Regular season

Schedule

Standings

Playoffs
The Predators were seeded first overall in the AFL playoffs.

Awards

References

Orlando Predators seasons
1994 Arena Football League season
Orlando Predators Season, 1994